is a JR West Geibi Line station located in Saka, Mukaihara-chō, Akitakata, Hiroshima Prefecture, Japan.

History
1915-04-28: Mukaihara Station opens
March 1986: The current station building was completed
1987-04-01: Japan National Railways is privatized, and Mukaihara Station becomes a JR West station

Station building and platforms
Mukaihara Station features one raised island platform, capable of handling two lines simultaneously. The station building includes a supermarket as well as a promotional center for local industries. Mukaihara is run by the Chūgoku Transportation Public Corporation, and features a Green Window.

Environs
Mukaihara Library
Mukaihara Post Office
Akitakata Municipal Offices, Mukaihara Branch
Akitakata Municipal Mukaihara Elementary School
Akitakata Municipal Mukaihara Junior High School
Hiroshima Prefectural Mukaihara High School
Misasa River
Takadakeyama
Hirauneyama

Highway access
 Hiroshima Prefectural Route 29 (Yoshida-Toyosaka Route)
 Hiroshima Prefectural Route 37 (Hiroshima-Miyoshi Route)

Connecting lines
All lines are JR West lines. 
Geibi Line
Miyoshi Express
Kōtachi Station — Mukaihara Station — Shiwaguchi Station
Miyoshi Liner
Kōtachi Station — Mukaihara Station — Karuga Station
Commuter Liner/Local
Yoshidaguchi Station — Mukaihara Station — Ibaraichi Station

External links
 JR West

Geibi Line
Railway stations in Hiroshima Prefecture
Railway stations in Japan opened in 1915